9th Congress may refer to:

9th Congress of the Philippines (1992–1995)
9th Congress of the Russian Communist Party (Bolsheviks) (1920)
9th Congress of the Sammarinese Communist Party (1976)
9th National Congress of the Chinese Communist Party (1969)
9th National Congress of the Communist Party of Vietnam (2001)
9th National Congress of the Kuomintang (1963)
9th National Congress of the Lao People's Revolutionary Party (2011)
9th National People's Congress (1998–2003)
9th United States Congress (1805–1807)